The space policy of the Donald Trump administration, as of December 2020, comprises five Space Policy Directives and an announced "National Space Strategy" (issued March 28, 2018), representing a directional shift from the policy priorities and goals of his predecessor, Barack Obama. A National Space Policy was issued on December 9, 2020.

History

2017: Space Policy Directive-1 
On December 11, 2017, President Donald Trump issued a presidential memorandum also known as "Space Policy Directive-1". This directive amended Barack Obama's "Presidential Policy Directive 4," by replacing the paragraph beginning “Set far-reaching exploration milestones...” with the paragraph “Lead an innovative and sustainable program of exploration with commercial and international partners to enable human expansion across the solar system and to bring back to Earth new knowledge and opportunities. Beginning with missions beyond low-Earth orbit, the United States will lead the return of humans to the Moon for long-term exploration and utilization, followed by human missions to Mars and other destinations.”

2018: Space Policy Directive-2 
On May 24, 2018, Donald Trump issued Space Policy Directive-2, "Streamlining Regulations on Commercial Use of Space," which begins
"Section 1. Policy. It is the policy of the executive branch to be prudent and responsible when spending taxpayer funds, and to recognize how government actions, including Federal regulations, affect private resources. It is therefore important that regulations adopted and enforced by the executive branch promote economic growth; minimize uncertainty for taxpayers, investors, and private industry; protect national security, public-safety, and foreign policy interests; and encourage American leadership in space commerce." 

The subsequent sections direct changes to existing policy as follows: 

 Section 2 requires the Department of Transportation to, by February 1, 2019, review its licensing procedures and regulations for launch and re-entry of commercial space vehicles and "rescind or revise those regulations, or publish for notice and comment proposed rules rescinding or revising" them. It also directs the Secretary of Transportation to consider a single blanket license for commercial spaceflight, and to consider "replacing prescriptive requirements in the commercial space flight launch and re-entry licensing process with performance-based criteria," in coordination with the National Space Council.

 In Section 2(c), the Secretary of Defense and the NASA Administrator are also directed examine regulatory requirements for commercial spaceflight launches and re-entry operations from federal government ranges and "to minimize those requirements, except those necessary to protect public safety and national security," to assist the Secretary of Transportation in implementing the directive. In Sec. 2(c), the Secretary of Commerce is directed to rescind or revise regulations pertaining to remote sensing satellites that might impede the goals of Section 1, and to coordinate with the aforementioned officials as well as the Secretary of State and, as appropriate, the Chairman of the Federal Communications Commission.

2018: Space Policy Directive-3 
On June 18, 2018, Donald Trump issued Space Policy Directive-3 (SPD-3), "National Space Traffic Management Policy." Section 6 conveys the actual responsibilities generated by the directives in the preceding sections, instructing the members of the National Space Council to come up with plans, and directing the Administrator of the National Aeronautics and Space Administration (NASA Administrator), the Secretaries of State, Defense, Commerce, and Transportation, the Director of National Intelligence, and the Chairman of the Federal Communications Commission (FCC) to implement Space Situational Awareness (SSA), Space Traffic Management (STM), and development of appropriate Science & Technology research to support expansion and interoperability (internationally and between various parties domestically) of SSA and STM systems. Preserving the space environment for safe operations is in every nation's best interests, so the policy leads in the direction of cooperation on collision avoidance, orbital debris mitigation, etc. This reiterates concerns raised in the 2010 National Space Policy, but expands with directives to various agencies who are stakeholders, and includes the recently re-formed National Space Council.

2018: Space Policy Directive-4 and Space Force 
On October 23, 2018, the White House issued a press release detailing the recommendations that will be addressed in Space Policy Directive-4 (SPD-4). These are centered on the formation of a Space Force, and follow the guidelines of Donald Trump's June 18, 2018 directive to the Department of Defense to immediately begin the process necessary to establish Space Force as a separate military branch. 

The six recommendations are:

 Forming a United States Space Command to control our space forces and develop the tactics, techniques, and procedures for military space operations.
 Establishing the Space Force as a separate and distinct branch of the military whose mission will be to organize, train, and equip combat space forces.
 Calling on Congress to authorize the establishment of a Space Force and provide funding for the United States Space Command.
 Launching a joint review by the National Space Council and National Security Council of existing space operational authorities for meeting national security objectives, informed by DOD's assessment of the authorities required.
 Creating a Space Development Agency to ensure Americans in the Space Force have cutting-edge warfighting capabilities.
 Creating collaborative mechanisms with the Intelligence Community to improve unity of efforts for the development of space capabilities and operations.

During the 2019 State of the Union Address, Donald Trump said: "This year, American astronauts will go back to space in American rockets," referring to SpaceX's Crew Dragon, which was launched on May 30, 2020, to be the first crewed orbital spaceflight launched from the United States since 2011.

2020: Executive Order 13959 

In November 2020, U.S. President Donald Trump issued an executive order prohibiting U.S. companies and individuals owning shares in companies that the United States Department of Defense has listed as having links to the People's Liberation Army, which includes the aerospace industry of China.

2020: National Space Policy 
On December 9, 2020, the White House issued a National Space Policy. This policy advocates for expanding U.S. leadership in space, allowing unfettered access to space, encouraging private sector growth, expanding international cooperation, and establishing a human presence on the moon with an eventual human mission to Mars.

See also
 Space policy of the United States
 United States Space Force

References

2018 in American politics
2018 in spaceflight
2018 speeches
NASA oversight
Space policy
Space policy of the United States
Speeches by Donald Trump
Presidency of Donald Trump
United States federal policy
Space policy by United States presidential administration
Trumpism
Policies of Donald Trump